The Singing Stone is a young adult novel by O. R. Melling that follows a modern-day girl named Kay as she travels to Ireland and travels back to Bronze-Age Ireland. She alongside Aherne of the Tuatha Dé Danann must find the lost treasures of the Tuatha Dé Danann to combat the upcoming invasion. The novel was first published in 1984. It has sold over 25,000 copies.

The book was shortlisted for the Ruth Schwartz Children's Book Award in 1987.

Plot

Reception 
The Globe and Mail described it as "a lively adventure exhibiting more than a little ingenious sleight-of-mind magic".

References

1984 Canadian novels
Novels set in Ireland
Canadian fantasy novels
Young adult fantasy novels
Novels about time travel